Liu Fusheng (October 1931 – 19 February 2021) was a Chinese politician. He was born in Dingxiang County, Shanxi. He joined the Chinese Communist Party in 1947. He was People's Congress Chairman and CPPCC Chairman of Hunan.

Career
Liu was born in Dingxiang County, Shanxi, in October 1931. He entered the workforce in 1945, and joined the Chinese Communist Party in 1947. After the establishment of the Communist State, he worked in central China's Hunan province. In March 1982, he was appointed First Communist Party Secretary of Changsha, a position he held until February 1983. He rose to become chairman of the Hunan People's Congress in 1998, a position he held for ten years. In January 1998, he became chairman of the Hunan Provincial Committee of the Chinese People's Political Consultative Conference, and served until January 2001.

He was a delegate to the 12th and 13th National Congress of the Chinese Communist Party. He was a delegate to 4th, 7th and 8th National People's Congress. He was a member of the 9th National Committee of the Chinese People's Political Consultative Conference.

References

1931 births
2021 deaths
People's Republic of China politicians from Shanxi
Chinese Communist Party politicians from Shanxi
Vice-governors of Hunan
Politicians from Xinzhou
Delegates to the 4th National People's Congress
Delegates to the 7th National People's Congress
Delegates to the 8th National People's Congress
Members of the 9th Chinese People's Political Consultative Conference